The 1978–79 Quebec Nordiques season was the Nordiques' seventh season in the WHA, were coming off of a 40–37–3 record in the 1977–78 season and a loss in the playoff semi-finals. The Nordiques improved to 41–34–5 to qualify for the playoffs, but lost in the first round to eventual Avco Cup champions Winnipeg Jets.

After the season was finished, the WHA announced that four of its teams, the Nordiques, Edmonton Oilers, New England Whalers and Winnipeg Jets would be admitted to the National Hockey League as expansion teams for the 1979–80 NHL season, and that the WHA would cease operations.  During their seven seasons in the WHA, Quebec had a record of 295–237–24, while winning the 1977 Avco Cup.

Off-season
During the off-season, the league would lose the Houston Aeros, as they elected to fold as the club was not part of an NHL-WHA merger, leaving the WHA with seven teams.  The league also announced that games against all-star teams from the Soviet Union, Czechoslovakia and Finland would once again count in the standings.  The Nordiques would hire a new head coach, as Jacques Demers would take over from Maurice Filion, who ended the previous season as the interim head coach.  Demers had previously coached the Indianapolis Racers and Cincinnati Stingers.

Regular season
The Nordiques would start the season slowly, going winless in their opening five games, however, the team snapped out of their slump, winning ten of their next thirteen games to push themselves over the .500 mark.  Quebec would stay consistent throughout the season, easily clinching a playoff berth, as the Nordiques would finish the season with a 41-34-5 record, finishing second in the league behind the Edmonton Oilers, who had eleven more points than Quebec.

Offensively, Quebec was led by Real Cloutier, who won the Bill Hunter Trophy by earning a league high 129 points.  It was the fourth year in a row that a player from the Nordiques (Marc Tardif in 1976 and 1978, and Cloutier in 1977) would win that award.  Cloutier scored a team record 75 goals, and added 54 assists.  Marc Tardif had another solid season, scoring 41 goals and 96 points, while Serge Bernier added 36 goals and 82 points.  Rich Leduc joined the 30 goal club, as he registered 30 goals and 62 points.  On defense, Paul Baxter led the way, scoring 10 goals and 46 points, as well as a team high 240 PIM.  Forty-year-old J. C. Tremblay had a productive year, earning 44 points in 56 games.

In goal, Richard Brodeur and Jim Corsi split the action, with Brodeur winning a team high 25 games, as well as a club best 3.11 GAA.  Corsi had 16 victories and a 3.30 GAA, while both goaltenders earned three shutouts.

Season standings

Schedule and results

Playoffs
In the opening round of the playoffs, Quebec would face the Winnipeg Jets in a best of seven semi-final series.  The Jets finished the season with a 39-35-6 record, earning 84 points, and a third-place finish.  The series opened with two games in Quebec, however, the Jets struck first, easily dominating the Nordiques in the series opener, by winning the game 6-3, before crushing Quebec in the second game 9-2 to take a two-game series lead.  The series moved to Winnipeg for the next two games, and the Jets would stay hot, as they continued to dominate the Nordiques in the third and fourth games of the series, winning them 9-5 and 6-2 respectively to sweep Quebec out of the playoffs.

Winnipeg Jets 4, Quebec Nordiques 0

Player statistics

Awards and records

Transactions

See also
 1978–79 WHA season

References

SHRP Sports
The Internet Hockey Database

Quebec Nordiques seasons
Que
Quebec